Kawana Shoppingworld is a regional shopping centre located in Buddina, Queensland, Australia, that is operated by Mirvac. Anchor tenants include Coles Supermarkets, Aldi, Woolworths Supermarkets, Big W, and JB Hi-Fi.

History
The centre opened in 1979 and was the first shopping centre to open on the Sunshine Coast. The centre has since undergone refurbishments. In 2002 a new food court was developed along with the addition of Bi-Lo (now Coles Supermarkets). Another extension began in January 2013 and included an Aldi supermarket and over 70 specialty stores which opened in mid-2014. In 2017 work began to add a 10-screen cinema and to expand the dining district and associated car par by 750 places.

Public transport
Kawana Shoppingworld is serviced by multiple Sunbus routes from Maroochydore, University of the Sunshine Coast, Sippy Downs and Caloundra.  A new station was built in 2014.

References

External links
 

Kawana Waters, Queensland
Shopping centres on the Sunshine Coast, Queensland
Shopping malls established in 1979
1979 establishments in Australia